Altamura Diocesan Museum Matroneum (also MUDIMA) is a museum located inside  Altamura Cathedral, whose entrance is on the left side of the church's main entrance. It is located on the second and third floors, in the so-called matroneum of Altamura Cathedral. Among other things, the museum holds statues from the Middle Ages, the XV and XVI centuries. Books, notary letters, reliquaries as well as most of the cultural heritage collected in Altamura Cathedral over the centuries are on exhibition inside the museum. The so-called Murat's cloak is also on exhibition.

History 

The museum opened in 2016, thanks to Msgr. Giovanni Ricchiuti, bishop of the diocese of Altamura-Gravina-Acquaviva delle Fonti.

See also 
 Altamura
 Archivio Biblioteca Museo Civico
 University of Altamura

References

Bibliography

External links 
 Official website of Museo Diocesano Matronei Altamura (MUDIMA)

2016 establishments in Italy
Museums in Altamura
Libraries in Altamura
Altamura